Shangri-La Toronto is a luxury hotel and residential condominium building in downtown Toronto, Ontario, Canada. It was designed by James K. M. Cheng and built by Westbank Projects Corp.; they also designed and built the Living Shangri-La in Vancouver. The building is 214 meters tall and is one of the fifteen tallest buildings in Toronto. The hotel component is run by Shangri-La Hotels and Resorts and has 202 guest rooms and suites. The condominium portion occupies the upper floors of the building and consists of 393 units. Excavation of the site started in 2008, and work on the parking garage began in early 2009.

History

Shangri-La Toronto is located on University Avenue and Adelaide Street, in an area just west of the Financial District that has seen rapid growth in recent years. The site was previously home to a number of smaller structures, most notably the historic Bishop's Block. The Bishop's Block was built in the 1830s by John Bishop, who built a series of Georgian row houses on the site. 

Most buildings were eventually torn down and replaced with a large parking lot. The one exception was a structure that served as one of the city's first hotels and then for many decades as a pub, the Pretzel Bell Tavern, which became a popular hangout of the Maple Leafs. It too was abandoned for several decades, but as a heritage structure, it was not torn down. This building was disassembled for the construction of Shangri-La Toronto, but the developers had pledged to rebuild and restore the Bishop's Block as part of the project. 

Before excavation, the site was the subject of several months of archaeological exploration, and many artifacts from the city's early history were found. At 102 ft (31 m), Shangri-La Toronto was the second-deepest excavation for a building in Canada's history, with only Scotia Plaza being deeper. This was done to create an eight-level below-grade parking garage.

See also
List of tallest buildings in Canada
List of tallest buildings in Toronto

References

Gray Jeff, "Hotel-condo complex gets committee nod" The Globe and Mail
Hume, Christopher. "Brief window into the past: Archeologists have 4 months to excavate a former upscale neighbourhood before another is built." Aug 06, 2007.

External links
 
 Shangri-La Hotel, Toronto - official website
 Hariri Pontarini Architects - Shangri-La Toronto

Residential skyscrapers in Toronto
Skyscraper hotels in Canada
Shangri-La Hotels and Resorts
Hotel buildings completed in 2012
Condo hotels in Canada
Hotels in Toronto
James K. M. Cheng buildings
2012 establishments in Ontario